Mediehuset København (Mediahouse Copenhagen) is a media production company located in Copenhagen, Denmark. The company's core business is production of content for all digital media platforms such as television, corporate websites and social media: Facebook, YouTube, Google +, LinkedIn and Twitter. Mediehuset Copenhagen has also worked as a broadcast company for many television stations in Denmark - including Kanal København and Kanal Hovedstaden. Mediehuset København has many years of experience in developing and implementing of training and courses in digital media production for a wide range of organizations and companies.

Mediehuset København (Media House Copenhagen) is the only media house in Denmark producing video and TV with EU content every day. Bideo.dk is a web portal with exclusively European and EU content. Bideo.dk is developed by Mediehuset København with support from the European Board in Denmark. The site is in Danish.

Mediehuset København is a media company with facilities for
 Broadcasting 
 Green screen and digital design productions 
 Corporate video productions
 Streaming & flow TV
 Live-streaming to internet, intranet, Facebook and YouTube

Mediehuset København has since 1994 served as a production facility house and Broadcaster for several TV stations, including broadcasters at Channel Capital (Kanal Hovedstaden). The headquarters (located at the Central Station in Copenhagen) includes i.a. 
 3-camera HD studio with green screen 
 Digital design studio setups for productions for TV, video production and live-streaming
 Broadcast facilities (able to transmit broadcasts direct from playout systems / digital program execution)

The virtual studio is a computer generated studio where presenters and guests are placed in a digital scenography. It’s especially useful when producing several productions over a short time frame, as for example with corporate TV.

Mediehuset København daily produces TV shows and videos, from talk shows, discussion programs, consumer programs, magazine feature and news reports - for business portraits, advertising, sponsorship billboards, trailers and vignettes.

In 2008 Mediehuset København began the development of User-generated TV (BGTV).  A project that intends to enable a method in which TV viewers produce content for TV. The content is transmitted directly from e.g. the user's mobile phone.

References

External links 

 
 
 
 Mediehuset København at linkedin.com
  Kanalkobenhavn.dk
  Kanalhovedstaden.dk
 www.toontv.dk
 www.toontv.se
 www.toontv.no
 www.bideo.dk

Mass media companies of Denmark
Mass media companies based in Copenhagen
Film production companies of Denmark
Danish companies established in 1993
Companies based in Copenhagen Municipality